The Gas Act 1965 (1965 chapter 36) is an Act of the Parliament of the United Kingdom which extended the powers of the Gas Council to buy, make or supply gas; it authorised and controlled the underground storage of gas; and permitted the sale of industrial gas for non-fuel purposes. The Act was in response to changing technologies that had developed since the gas industry was nationalised in 1949.

To finance the increased scope of the Gas Council the Gas (Borrowing Powers) Act 1965 (1965 chapter 60) was enacted which increased the Council’s borrowing powers to up to £1,200 million.

Background 
The government recognised that there had been significant technological progress and changes in the gas industry since nationalisation in 1949. There were new possibilities of undertaking large-scale supply schemes associated with the import of liquefied natural gas from Algeria and the discovery of natural gas on the UK Continental Shelf. There were also opportunities for underground gas storage. Such storage enabled the industry to build up a reserve of gas in summer, when demand was low, which was drawn down to meet the higher demand in winter.

The Gas Act 1965 had two main purposes: to make changes in the structure of the gas industry; and to allow the industry to develop underground storage of gas in natural strata. A subsidiary purpose was to amend Section 52 of the 1948 Act dealing with the industry's monopoly of piped gas supplies for use as fuel. The Gas Council was given powers to manufacture gas and supply it to the Area Gas Boards.

The increased scope of work of the Gas Council was financed by increased borrowing. The limit had been £650 million, the Gas (Borrowing Powers) Act 1965 was enacted which increased the Council’s borrowing to up to £1,200 million.

Gas Act 1965 
The Gas Act 1965 (1965 c. 36) received Royal Assent on 5 August 1965. Its long title is: ‘An Act to confer additional functions on the Gas Council and to make further provision as to the rating of the Gas Council and Area Gas Boards; to increase the number of members of the Gas Council; to regulate and facilitate the storage of gas by the Council and those Boards in underground strata, and to modify section 52 of the Gas Act 1948; and for connected purposes.’

Provisions 
The provisions of the Act comprise 37 Sections in 3 Parts and 6 Schedules

 Part I – The Gas Council
 Section 1. Empowered the Gas Council to manufacture and supply gas and solid fuels
 Section 2. Empowered the Minister to appoint additional members of the Gas Council
 Section 3. Rating of the Gas Council and other gas authorities
 Part II – Underground storage of gas by gas authorities
 Sections 4 to 28 concerning the authorisation, control, compensation, rights, responsibilities liabilities, safety conditions for the underground storage of gas
 Part III – General
 Section 29. Modification of section 52 of principal Act, allowed sale of gas for industrial purposes which do not consist of or include the use as a fuel
 Section 30. General powers of gas authorities
 Section 31. Financial provisions
 Section 32. Short title, interpretation, extent and commencement
 Schedules
 Schedule 1. Amendments as respects functions of Gas Council
 Schedule 2. Storage Authorisation Orders
 Schedule 3. Certificates and Statutory Licences
 Schedule 4. Acquisition of land
 Schedule 5. Inquiries into accidents
 Schedule 6. Power to enter land and to prospect and survey Land

Consequences of the Act 
The effect of the Act was to put the Gas Council on a par with the Area Gas Boards. It was enabled ‘to manufacture gas, to get or acquire gas in or from Great Britain or elsewhere and to supply gas in bulk to any area board. It was also enabled to manufacture, treat, supply or sell solid fuels, products or by-products, in the same way as the area boards.

The Gas Council played an increasing role in the direction of the British gas industry. It acted as the central purchaser of Natural gas from Algeria and the North Sea, the distribution of which was national enterprise.

The Act allowed the Minister to appoint three extra members to the Gas Council Board, this was increased to five in 1968.

Gas (Borrowing Powers) Act 1965 
The increased remit of the Gas Council was reflected in the Gas (Borrowing Powers) Act 1965 which was enacted to increase the Council's financial limit from £650 million to £900 million, although the Minister of Power was empowered to increase this to £1,200 million. The Gas Council expected that £1,000 million would cover its requirements to 1970.

As a consequence of the Section 1(3)(a) of the Gas and Electricity Act 1968 the Gas (Borrowing Powers) Act 1968 ceased to have effect.

Later enactments 
Sections 1–3, 29 and 30 of the 1965 Act were repealed by the Gas Act 1972

The Gas Act 1986 amended parts of the Gas Act 1965

See also 

 Oil and gas industry in the United Kingdom
 British Gas

References 

United Kingdom Acts of Parliament 1965
Natural gas industry in the United Kingdom